L'Aquila Cathedral is a Roman Catholic cathedral in L'Aquila, Abruzzo, Italy, dedicated to Saint Maximus of Aveia and Saint George. It is the episcopal seat of the Archdiocese of L'Aquila.

History
The cathedral was originally built in the 13th century and destroyed in the earthquake of 1703. It was restored in the 19th century and further restored in the 20th. It was seriously damaged in the earthquake of 2009, and is presently unusable (2015). From August 2013 the functions of the cathedral were temporarily transferred to the Basilica of Santa Maria di Collemaggio, itself also damaged in the earthquake and now closed to worship for rebuilding works; and later transferred again to the Basilica of San Giuseppe Artigiano, not far from the cathedral, rebuilt and reopened after the earthquake of July 2012. As of April 2015, work on the cathedral had not yet started; it was scheduled to begin in September 2015.

Notes and references

Sources

Abruzzo. Guide Verdi. Touring Club Italiano, 2015. 

Buildings and structures in L'Aquila
L'Aquila
L'Aquila
Neoclassical architecture in Abruzzo
Neoclassical church buildings in Italy